Fort Randolph was an American Revolutionary War fort which stood at the confluence of the Ohio and Kanawha Rivers, on the site of present-day Point Pleasant, West Virginia, USA.

Built in 1776 on the site of an earlier fort from Dunmore's War, Fort Randolph is best remembered as the place where the famous Shawnee Chief Cornstalk was murdered in 1777. The fort withstood attack by American Indians in 1778 but was abandoned the next year. It was rebuilt in the 1780s after the renewal of hostilities between the United States and American Indians, but saw little action and was eventually abandoned once again. Two centuries later, a replica of the fort has been built about a mile away.

History

Background
The site where Fort Randolph was built emerged as a strategic location in the years before the American Revolution. In the Treaty of Fort Stanwix of 1768, the British Crown acquired the title to present-day West Virginia from the Iroquois. Thereafter, American colonists and land speculators began to explore the region. One of the first to do so was George Washington, a planter and politician from Virginia, who in 1770 made a long canoe trip down the Ohio River to examine the land around Point Pleasant. Many other American colonists and surveyors did the same over the next few years.

The American Indians of the Ohio Country, who hunted on the land south of the Ohio River, had not been consulted in the 1768 treaty. The eventual result was Dunmore's War in 1774, fought primarily between American militiament from Virginia and Shawnees and Mingos from the Ohio Country, led by Chief Cornstalk. The Battle of Point Pleasant, the only major battle of the war, was fought on the future site of Fort Randolph. After the battle, a small fort called Fort Blair was built near the battlefield. With the outbreak of the American Revolutionary War in 1775, however, Lord Dunmore, the Royal Governor of Virginia, ordered the abandonment of the fort, one of his last actions before being forced from office by the American revolutionaries.

Revolutionary War
In 1776, the Virginia Assembly, alarmed at the defenseless state of their western border, ordered a new fort built on the site. Virginia militiamen under Captain Matthew Arbuckle, Sr., built Fort Randolph in May 1776. It was named after Peyton Randolph, the first president of the Continental Congress, who had died the previous year. The fort, along with Fort Pitt and Fort Henry, was intended to prevent Indian raids into western Virginia and Pennsylvania.

The forts failed to deter raids. In November 1776, Andrew Donnally and Archer Mathews, commissaries for the fort, described the difficulties of supplying the fort with food and provisions due to the constant threat of Indian attack. In 1777, the Americans made preparations for an offensive expedition into the Ohio Country. In November, Cornstalk made a diplomatic visit to Fort Randolph in order to discuss the rumored expedition. Shawnees who followed Cornstalk wanted to stay out of the war, but Cornstalk warned the Americans that he would not be able to keep all of the tribe neutral. Although the proposed campaign had been cancelled because of a manpower shortage, Captain Arbuckle decided to detain Cornstalk and several other Shawnees as hostages in order to ensure that the Shawnees stayed neutral. When an American militiaman was killed outside the fort by Indians on November 10, his enraged companions charged into the fort and murdered Cornstalk and the other three Shawnee prisoners. Virginia's governor Patrick Henry brought the killers to trial, but they were acquitted because no one would testify against them.

On May 20, 1778, about 200 Wyandots and Mingos under Dunquat, the Wyandot "Half King", surrounded Fort Randolph and began a week-long siege. Unable to compel the surrender of the fort, the Indians then moved up the Kanawha to attack Fort Donnally, which also withstood attack. Apparently because resources were needed elsewhere, Fort Randolph was abandoned by the Americans in 1779. Indians burned the fort after it was abandoned.

Twice rebuilt
The fort was rebuilt nearby in 1785 during the growth of violence which led to the Northwest Indian War.

A replica of the fort was built in 1973–74 and dedicated on 10 October 1974, the 200th anniversary of the Battle of Point Pleasant. The town of Point Pleasant had spread over where the fort had stood, and so the rebuilt fort was located at Krodel Park, about one mile from the original location.

References

External links
 - official site
Mason County Convention and Visitors Bureau
Fort Lee Scouts
Fort Randolph Video - Visitor video

1776 establishments in Virginia
Infrastructure completed in 1776
Infrastructure completed in 1785
Randolph
Randolph
Buildings and structures in Mason County, West Virginia
Shawnee history
Randolph
Museums in Mason County, West Virginia
Military and war museums in West Virginia
American Revolutionary War museums
Rebuilt buildings and structures in West Virginia
Point Pleasant, West Virginia